A Clash of Kings is the comic book adaptation of George R. R. Martin's fantasy novel A Clash of Kings, the second in the A Song of Ice and Fire. It is a sequel to the comic book adaptation of A Game of Thrones.

Production
The comic book series is scripted by comic book writer Landry Walker and drawn by Mel Rubi, with covers by Rubi and by Mike S. Miller. It is intended to be a closer adaption of the novels. Following its first issue publication in 2017, at a rate of about a page of art for each page of text.

Publication history
Sixteen issues of A Clash of Kings were released until the series went on hiatus  in March 2019. In January 2020, new releases continued marketed as A Clash of Kings Part II. There are 32 issues published with the series further being published into compilation volumes, each one containing 8 issues. All 4 volumes have been published with the fourth set published on October 2, 2022.

Hardcover collections

Reception
The series currently holds a score of 7.0 out of 10 on the review aggregator website Comic Book Roundup, based on 22 total reviews for the series' 31 published issues.

References

External links
George R.R. Martin's A Clash of Kings at Dynamite Entertainment
George R.R. martin's A Clash of Kings Vol. 2 at Dynamite Entertainment

Comics based on novels
Dynamite Entertainment titles
Works based on A Song of Ice and Fire